Buttermilk Channel is a small tidal strait in Upper New York Bay in New York City, approximately  long and  wide, separating Governors Island from Brooklyn. The channel is marked by a number of navigation aids (green cans no. 5 and 7 at the northeast entrance, and green gong no. 1, marking low water off the tip of Governors Island).  Tidal currents on the channel are rather strong.

History 
Origins of the name are uncertain but it is alleged to be a reference to the dairy farmers who used to cross this channel by boat to sell their milk in Manhattan markets. Some people believe that the channel got its name because crossing it was so rough that the farmers' milk was churned into butter by the time they reached Manhattan. According to another legend, before the channel was dredged to accommodate cargo ships, cows were walked across it at low tide to graze on Governors Island. In his newspaper articles about Brooklyn history, Walt Whitman wrote of a time "as late as the Revolutionary War (when) cattle were driven across from Brooklyn, over what is now Buttermilk Channel, to Governor's Island."

On the Brooklyn side, modern development started in the 1840s, when the Atlantic Basin and docks, and the "Erie Basin" were started. The former is now the Red Hook Container Port and the Brooklyn Cruiseship Terminal, while the latter is now the site of the Brooklyn IKEA.

In 1902 the channel was dredged extensively by the U.S. Army Corps of Engineers. Subsequent modifications were made in 1913, 1935 and 1962. Until the late 20th century the primary user of the channel was the U.S. Coast Guard, which had a local headquarters on Governors Island.

In April 2015 the Army Corps of Engineers issued a Request for Proposals for additional maintenance dredging of Buttermilk Channel. The channel was fully dredged in fiscal year 2016.

See also
Geography of New York–New Jersey Harbor Estuary

References

Red Hook Gowanus Historical Guide (Brooklyn Historical Society, 2000)

Straits of New York County, New York
Straits of Kings County, New York
Port of New York and New Jersey